This list includes Immovable Cultural Heritage sites in the Rasina District of Serbia.

Cultural monuments

Archaeological Sites

Historic Landmarks

Spatial Cultural-Historical Units

See also
 Immovable Cultural Heritage of Exceptional Importance (Serbia)
 Immovable Cultural Heritage of Great Importance (Serbia)

References

Cultural heritage of Serbia
Monuments and memorials in Serbia